Andrea Contarini was doge of Venice from 1367 to 1382.  He served as doge during the War of Chioggia, which was fought between the Venetian Republic and the Republic of Genoa.

Contarini was noted for his personal bravery during the war.  He also led a fundraising effort in which he personally liquidated his fortune for the country.  Though in his seventies, he took personal command of the Venetian Navy (with Admiral Vettor Pisani as his chief of staff) and led troops in the critical Battle of Chioggia.

Notes

References

14th-century Doges of Venice
Andrea
Republic of Venice admirals
People of the War of Chioggia